Oncidium blanchetii is a species of orchid native to eastern and southern Brazil. Found in the cool mountains, hot and humid lowlands and inland savannahs of eastern and southeastern Brazil as a medium-sized, cool growing epiphyte that occurs at elevations of 800 to 2000 meters with clustered, erect, oblong or narrowly ovoid-oblong, compressed, smooth and then sulcate with age pseudobulbs carrying 3 apical, erect, rigid, coriaceous, narrowly linear-ligulate, acute leaves and blooms in the spring through summer on an erect, 2' to 5'4"" [60 to 160 cm] long, robust, paniculate, many flowered inflorescence that is longer than the leaves and has concave, lanceolate bracts.

References

External links 

blanchetii
Orchids of Brazil